August "Augie" Grill (born November 14, 1976) is an American professional stock car racing driver. He is the son of legendary car owner and chassis builder, Frankie Grill. He currently races Super Late Models predominantly in the southeast. He is best known for winning the Snowball Derby in 2007 and 2008.

Motorsports career results

NASCAR
(key) (Bold – Pole position awarded by qualifying time. Italics – Pole position earned by points standings or practice time. * – Most laps led.)

Camping World Truck Series

References

External links
 

1976 births
NASCAR drivers
American Speed Association drivers
CARS Tour drivers
Living people
Sportspeople from Birmingham, Alabama
Racing drivers from Alabama